The nineteenth season of the reality show singing competition American Idol premiered on February 14, 2021 on the ABC television network. It is the fourth season to air on ABC since the series' revival. Ryan Seacrest returned as host. Katy Perry, Luke Bryan, and Lionel Richie returned as judges and Bobby Bones returned as mentor. 

Chayce Beckham from Apple Valley, California, won the season on May 23, 2021, while Willie Spence was the runner-up, and Grace Kinstler finished in third place.

Auditions 
Due to the COVID-19 pandemic in the United States, the show offered its first ever live virtual auditions to aspiring contestants through its Idol Across America program using custom-built Zoom technology to mirror the way the audition was done in previous season but in a home environment. The remote auditions took place from August 10 to October 28, 2020, in 50 states plus Washington, D.C., as well as a number of open-call auditions, and from these the producers selected the contestants who can then audition in front of the judges.

Also due to the pandemic that limited travel for the judges, the judges' auditions were held in only three locations across California: Los Angeles, San Diego, and Ojai. The judges' auditions started on October 5, 2020, with a number of health and safety protocols in place, such as separate tables for the judges and regular COVID-19 testing for cast and crew.

Hollywood Week 
Hollywood Week was filmed December 7–10, 2020, at the Dolby Theatre in Los Angeles, California. The Genre and Duet Challenges return from last season. The genres for this season were Indie folk, Pop, Rock, R&B, Soul, and Country. After all the contestants in their respective groups performed, the judges brought them to the stage and made their decisions. The ones who have made it advanced to the Duet Challenge. Unlike last season where the contestants picked their duet partners, the judges picked them. The duets were given twenty-four hours to rehearse, including advice from one of the judges. The remaining contestants who have passed the Duet Challenge advanced to the Showstopper Round.

Showstopper Round 
The Showstopper Round aired on March 28 and 29, featuring the top sixty-four (thirty-seven aired) performing for the judges at the Dolby Theatre. The following day, the judges narrowed the number of contestants down to twenty-four in the Final Judgment. The following is a list of the contestants who performed, the song they performed at the Showstopper, and if they advanced or not.

Color key:

Top 24 

The Top 24 contestants were split into two groups of twelve. Pre-recorded performances of the first group aired on April 4 and the second group on April 5. After each contestant's solo, pre-recorded performances of their duets aired. Idol contestants were paired with celebrity singers as their duet partners. The artists who duetted with the first group included Jimmie Allen, Ryan Tedder, Katharine McPhee, Ben Rector, Brian McKnight, and Joss Stone. The artists who duetted with the second group included PJ Morton, Tori Kelly, Josh Groban, Jason Aldean, Jewel, and Brandon Boyd.

Color key:

Top 16 (April 11 and 12) 
The Top 16 performances were taped on April 8, 2021, and aired on Sunday, April 11, followed by the live results on Monday, April 12.

Color key:

 Guest judge: Paula Abdul

Live shows 
Color key:

Week 1: Top 12 – Oscar Nominated Songs / The Comeback (April 18 and 19) 
The Top 12 performed Oscar nominated songs on Sunday, April 18, 2021. Ten select contestants from last season came back to compete for a second chance since last season's production was forced to go entirely remote because of the COVID-19 pandemic.

Week 2: Top 10 – Disney Night (May 2) 
The Top 10 performed Disney songs. John Stamos served as a guest mentor.

Week 3: Top 7 – Coldplay Songbook & Mother's Day Dedication (May 9) 
The Top 7 performed songs by Coldplay and songs dedicated to their mothers. Chris Martin served as a guest mentor.

Week 4: Top 4 – My Personal Idol/Artist Singles/Reprise Songs/Duets (May 16) 
The Top 4 performed songs from their personal idols, their winner's singles, a reprise of their favorite performance of the season and duets of two songs from guest mentor FINNEAS.

Week 5: Finale – Judges' Choice Songs/Hometown Songs/Reprise Songs (May 23) 
The Top 3 performed songs chosen by the judges, songs dedicated to their hometowns and a reprise of their favorite performance of the season. Bobby Bones returned as mentor this week.

Color key:

Elimination Chart 
Color key

Ratings

Notes

References

External links 
 

American Idol seasons
2021 American television seasons